Carrvale United F.C. was an English football club.

History
The club was a member of the Midland League during the late 1970s, finishing 4th in 1978, and also competed in the FA Vase on two occasions.

References

Defunct football clubs in Derbyshire
Midland Football League (1889)
Defunct football clubs in England